Bitter Honey may refer to:

Books
Bitter Honey, by Francis Pollock 1935
Bitter Honey, romantic novel by Helen Brooks (Rita Bradshaw) 1993
Bitter Honey (Grenki med), a novel by Andrej E. Skubic 1999
Bitter Honey, novel by Martin Joseph Freeman

Film
Bitter Honey, a 200 Nigerian film starring Hanks Anuku
Bitter Honey (2014 film), a documentary film that chronicles the lives of three polygamous families

Music
Bitter Honey (Eef Barzelay album)

Songs
"Miel amarga" (English: "Bitter Honey"), a ranchera song by Mexican recording artist Irma Serrano, 1966
"Bitter Honey", song by Paul Williams
"Bitter Honey", single by Ali Tennant, 1998
"Bitter Honey", by Angelou from While You Were Sleeping, 2009